The Lăpuș Mountains are a group of mountains in the Eastern Carpathians, located in the northern  Romanian regions of Maramureș and Bukovina. The maximum elevation of these mountains is around 1,800m  and a river also with the name  Lăpuş runs through the valley.

References

Mountain ranges of Romania
Mountain ranges of the Eastern Carpathians